Christina Garsten, (born 28 January 1962 in Mora, Dalarna) is a Swedish social anthropologist and academic in the field of social anthropology.

Biography

In 1994, Garsten graduated with the degree of doctor of philosophy in social anthropology from Stockholm University with the dissertation Apple World: Core and Periphery in a Transnational Organizational Culture. Garsten became professor at Stockholm University in 2008. Since 2011, she has been chair person at The Stockholm Centre for Organizational Research (SCORE) and since 2018, principal and permanent fellow at Swedish Collegium for Advanced Study. Between 2013–2015, Garsten was professor of globalization and organization at Copenhagen Business School in Copenhagen, Denmark.

She has been visiting professor at Georgetown University, ESCP Paris and Centre de Sociologie des Organisations (Sciences Po) as well as visiting researcher at Stanford University, London School of Economics and Political Science, École des Hautes Études en Sciences Sociales, University of Cambridge, European University Institute, Copenhagen Business School (CBS) and University of Leeds.

Selected books 

Discreet Power: How the World Economic Forum Shapes Global Markets, med Adrienne Sörbom (2018)
Power, Policy and Profit: Corporate Engagement in Politics and Governance, ed. with Adrienne Sörbom (2017)
Makt utan mandat, with Bo Rothstein and Stefan Svallfors (2015)
Makeshift Work in a Changing Labour Market: The Swedish Model in the Post–Financial Crisis Era, ed. with Jessica Lindvert and Renita Thedvall (2015)
Anthropology Now and Next: Diversity, Connections, Confrontations, Reflexivity, ed. with Thomas Hylland Eriksen and Shalini Randeria (2014)
Organisational Anthropology, ed. with Anette Nyqvist (2013)
Ethical Dilemmas in Management, ed. with Tor Hernes (2009)
Workplace Vagabonds (2008)
Organizing Transnational Accountability, ed. with Magnus Boström (2008)
Transparency in a New Global Order, ed. with Monica Lindh de Montoya (2008)

References

External links
Web page at Swedish Collegium for Advanced Study
Christina Garsten in Libris

1962 births
Living people
Social anthropologists
Stockholm University alumni
Academic staff of Uppsala University
Academic staff of Stockholm University
Swedish women non-fiction writers
21st-century Swedish non-fiction writers
Swedish women anthropologists